A marabba is an obsolete unit of area in India and Pakistan approximately equal to 25 acres, (10.117 hectares). After metrification by both countries in the 20th century, the unit became obsolete.

See also
List of customary units of measurement in South Asia
It is not obsolete. The unit is used by people today.
(25 Acres - they would know it by visual size of an average crop field.
- that will sustain 3 generations of an average family)

References

Units of area
Customary units in India
Obsolete units of measurement